General elections were held in Mexico on 7 July 1946. The presidential elections were won by Miguel Alemán Valdés, who received 77.9% of the vote. In the Chamber of Deputies election, the Institutional Revolutionary Party won 141 of the 147 seats.

Results

President

Chamber of Deputies

References

Presidential elections in Mexico
Mexico
General
Legislative elections in Mexico
July 1946 events in Mexico
Election and referendum articles with incomplete results